Thomasine may refer to:
 Thomasine (given name), an English feminine given name
 Thomasine Church, a community of Christians from Kerala, India
 Thomasines, early Christian Gnostic or a mysticist sect
 Thomasine Rite, used in churches descended from the Church of the East

See also 
 Thomas (disambiguation)